Audrey Phillips Beck (August 6, 1931 – March 11, 1983) was an American politician and educator.

Born in Brooklyn, New York, Beck moved with her family to Norwalk, Connecticut, where she grew up. Beck received her bachelor's and master's degree from University of Connecticut. From 1961 to 1967, Beck taught economics at the University of Connecticut. She was also visiting professor at Rutgers University. In 1967, Beck worked as an economist for the Windham Regional Planning Commission. From 1967 to 1975, Beck served in the Connecticut House of Representatives. She then served in the Connecticut State Senate from 1975 until her death in 1983. Beck lived in Storrs, Connecticut, and was a consultant for the insurance business Cigna Corporation. Beck committed suicide, by slashing her wrists, in a wooded area in Willington, Connecticut.

Notes

External links

1931 births
1983 suicides
American politicians who committed suicide
Politicians from Brooklyn
Politicians from Norwalk, Connecticut
People from Mansfield, Connecticut
University of Connecticut alumni
University of Connecticut faculty
Rutgers University faculty
Women state legislators in Connecticut
Democratic Party members of the Connecticut House of Representatives
Democratic Party Connecticut state senators
Burials in Connecticut
Suicides by sharp instrument in the United States
Suicides in Connecticut
20th-century American politicians
20th-century American women politicians
People from Storrs, Connecticut
Deaths from bleeding
1983 deaths
American women academics